Marston, Van Pelt, & Maybury and associated partnership names were architects in Pasadena, California.

Partners
Partners were Sylvanus Marston (1883-1946), Garrett Van Pelt (1879-1972) and Edgar Maybury.  The firm designed hundreds of custom homes in the Pasadena area.

A number of their works are listed on the U.S. National Register of Historic Places.

Projects
Works include (with attribution):
Fenyes Estate, 470 W. Walnut St. & 160 N. Orange Grove Blvd., Pasadena, CA (Marston & Van Pelt), NRHP-listed
Home Laundry, 432 S. Arroyo Pkwy., Pasadena, CA (Marston, Van Pelt & Maybury), NRHP-listed
USC Pacific Asia Museum, 46 N. Los Robles Ave., Pasadena, CA (Marston, Van Pelt & Maybury), NRHP-listed
Villa Verde, 800 S. San Rafael, Pasadena, CA (Marston, Van Pelt & Maybury), NRHP-listed
Vista del Arroyo Hotel and Bungalows, 125 S. Grand Ave., Pasadena, CA (Marston & Van Pelt, et al.), NRHP-listed
Wilmington Branch, 309 W. Opp St., Los Angeles, CA (Marston, Van Pelt & Maybury), NRHP-listed
The Bishop Estate, 4802 El Arco Iris, Rancho Santa Fe, CA (Marston & Mayberry), NRHP-listed
Ferdinand R. Bain House, 2911 Overland Ave., Los Angeles, CA (Marston, Van Pelt & Maybury), now part of Notre Dame Academy>

References
Renovations and Additions to a Historic Sylvanus Marston Residence of 1928 by architect James V. Coane & Associates

Defunct architecture firms based in California